Rahmatabad and Blukat District is a district (bakhsh) in Rudbar County, Gilan Province, Iran. At the 2006 census, its population was 17,652, in 4,759 families.  The District has one city: Tutkabon. The District has three rural districts (dehestan): Blukat Rural District, Dasht-e Veyl Rural District, and Rahmatabad Rural District.

References 

Rudbar County
Districts of Gilan Province